Jordan Walsh (born March 3, 2004) is an American college basketball player for the Arkansas Razorbacks of the Southeastern Conference (SEC).

Early life and high school
Walsh grew up in Desoto, Texas and initially attended Faith Family Academy in Dallas, Texas. He averaged 18 points, 11 rebounds, five assists, 2.4 steals and 2.3 blocks per game and was named class 4A All-State as a junior. Walsh transferred to Link Academy in Branson, Missouri prior to the start of his senior year. He averaged 15.3 points, 7.2 rebounds, and 3.1 assists in his only season at Link. Walsh was selected to play in the 2022 McDonald's All-American Boys Game during the season.

Walsh was rated a five-star recruit. ESPN analyst Paul Biancardi rated him as the best two-way player in the 2023 recruiting class. Walsh committed to play college basketball at Arkansas over offers from Texas, Memphis, Arizona State, and Kansas.

College career
Walsh entered his freshman season at Arkansas as starting wing. Midway through the season he was moved to the bench as a key reserve.

Personal life
Walsh has alopecia, an autoimmune condition which prevents the growth of hair on the body.

References

External links
Arkansas Razorbacks bio

2004 births
Living people
American men's basketball players
Arkansas Razorbacks men's basketball players
Basketball players from Dallas
Small forwards
McDonald's High School All-Americans